Stablemates is a 1938 American sports drama film directed by Sam Wood and starring Wallace Beery and Mickey Rooney.

Plot
Aspiring jockey Mickey idolizes hard-drinking former veterinarian Tom Terry, who shares advice about horses with Mickey. Tom tries to focus and collect his thoughts to perform a delicate operation on Mickey's beloved horse Lady-Q.

Cast
Wallace Beery as Doc Tom Terry
Mickey Rooney as Mickey
Arthur Hohl as Mr. Gale
Margaret Hamilton as Beulah Flanders
Minor Watson as Barney Donovan
Marjorie Gateson as Mrs. Shepherd
Oscar O'Shea as Pete Whalen

References

External links

1938 films
1930s sports drama films
American black-and-white films
American sports drama films
Films directed by Sam Wood
Films produced by Harry Rapf
American horse racing films
Metro-Goldwyn-Mayer films
Films with screenplays by Richard Maibaum
1938 drama films
1930s English-language films
1930s American films